Skomack Wielki (1938–45 ) is a village in the administrative district of Gmina Stare Juchy, within Ełk County, Warmian-Masurian Voivodeship, in northern Poland.

References

Skomack Wielki